Quahog is a fictional city in the U.S. state of Rhode Island that serves as the primary setting of the American animated sitcom Family Guy and other related media. The Griffin family, the Browns, the Swansons, and Glenn Quagmire live on Spooner Street, with the Griffin family residing at 31 Spooner Street. According to the season 10 episode "Tom Tucker: The Man and His Dream", the population of the town is 800. As revealed in the season 7 episode "Fox-y Lady", the city's ZIP code is 00093. Peter's birth certificate in the season 13 episode "Quagmire's Mom" gives Peter's birth location as Newport County.

Background 
In the season seven episode "Peter's Progress", Cleveland's Jamaican cousin Madame Claude reads Peter's palm and discovers that he was related to Griffin Peterson, the supposed founder of Quahog where the previously mentioned history of Quahog was a myth.

History 
In 17th-century England, Griffin Peterson proposes marriage to the love of his life, Lady Redbush (Lois), upon getting approval from Carter Redbush. Meanwhile, the cruel King Stewart III (Stewie) has the court jester (Brian) tell him jokes after "deleting" How I Met Your Mother from his "TiVo" (represented as archers killing Josh Radnor, Jason Segel, and Neil Patrick Harris).

While being carried around in his litter, King Stewart spots Lady Redbush strolling through town with Griffin Peterson and decides that she should marry him instead. While Griffin Peterson is on the way to his wedding, Stewart secretly kidnaps him, exiling him to the New World on one of the outgoing ships. As Lady Redbush waits in growing angst, King Stewart walks into the church. He tells Lady Redbush that Griffin Peterson is dead and proceeds to marry her himself. At sea, Griffin Peterson meets fellow exiles Joe (exiled for pleasuring himself in front of a carving), Quagmire (exiled for having sex with an underage girl), and Seamus. Upon reaching the New World, Griffin Peterson establishes the colony of Quahog, which eventually grows into a thriving settlement. Griffin Peterson moves on with his life, marrying another woman (Meg).

Back in London, Redbush suffers a dull sexless marriage with King Stewart since they're never available to each other. Lady Redbush continues to lament Griffin's supposed death until the jester reveals the truth by showing her the newspaper article about Quahog's founding. The jester stated that he was to keep quiet about this under threat of execution. Lady Redbush and the jester immediately depart for the New World on one of the slave ships. In Quahog, Griffin Peterson has grown irritated with his current wife until Lady Redbush arrives. Griffin Peterson and Lady Redbush are reunited and Griffin "divorces" his current wife by killing her with a blunderbuss.

Six months later, King Stewart learns that Redbush is gone and he makes his way to Quahog to reclaim his wife and kill Griffin Peterson. King Stewart's army arrives in Quahog where they terrorize the colony. King Stewart orders Cockney First Lieutenant (Chris) to search every house for them. Upon being discovered by the First Lieutenant, Griffin Peterson and Lady Redbush are confronted by King Stewart. Griffin Peterson threatens to kill the officer, while King Stewart threatens to kill Redbush.

After exchanging threats without getting anywhere, Griffin and Stewart decide to settle their dispute with a talent show, with the winner winning Lady Redbush's hand in marriage, and ownership of Quahog. For his act, King Stewart steals his jester's mostly unfunny jokes about his Aunt Frieda. However, Griffin, Quagmire, Joe, Cleveland, Mort, and Seamus effectively steal the show with a techno-rock song. This was enough to defeat King Stewart in the talent show. After King Stewart and his army leave for England, Griffin and Redbush remain in Quahog to live happily ever after.

People and locations

Mayor 
Adam West was the mayor of Quahog until the death of his namesake voice actor. He appeared on a recurring basis from his first appearance in season 2 until his final appearance in season 17. Quahog's current mayor is Mayor West's cousin, Wild Wild West, voiced by Sam Elliott, who was introduced in the episode "Wild Wild West".

News anchors 
The town's local "celebrities" are Tom Tucker, an arrogant, baritone-voiced news anchor at Channel 5, and Diane Simmons, the station's 40-year-old former news co-anchor who was killed off in "And Then There Were Fewer". The two work alongside Tricia Takanawa, a stereotypical Asian reporter who speaks with a nasal monotone cadence; and Blaccu-Weather meteorologist Ollie Williams, a fast-talking chubby African-American man who rarely speaks for more than about 1–2 seconds.

The Drunken Clam 
The Drunken Clam is a bar owned by Jerome and formerly Horace (who died in "Save the Clam") that Peter frequently visits along with his friends: Joe Swanson, a paraplegic police officer; former deli owner turned mailman Cleveland Brown and sex-crazed airline pilot bachelor Glenn Quagmire. The Drunken Clam is easily recognized by its animated neon sign on the roof at the front of the building. It depicts a clam swigging from a bottle and becoming intoxicated, judging by the "xx" eyes and the bubbles rising.

The Drunken Clam is also known as the location in which any of the group's schemes and adventures are hatched or take place. Peter works as an assembly worker in a toy factory in early episodes but is a self-employed fisherman and an employee of the fictitious Pawtucket Brewery in later episodes. Peter entertains the Clam's patrons on the piano while drunk in "Wasted Talent".

In "One if by Clam, Two if by Sea", after a hurricane, The Drunken Clam became "The Clam's Head Pub", much to Peter and the guys' disgust, as new owner Brit Nigel Pinchley took over. Despite their best efforts of them to claim back the bar, the Brits had convinced them to leave. However, after Pinchley burned down the Clam's Head Pub as an insurance fraud, and his subsequent arrest and execution, Horace returned from Florida, having had an alligator lay eggs in his lower intestine and getting into a knife-fight with his mother, losing a testicle in the process. The Clam was rebuilt by Horace, Peter and the gang and began running again. The episode reveals that Peter has been going to the Clam since at least 1977.

In "Blind Ambition", Peter falls off its roof and kills Joan Cusack. Also, in that same episode, the bar burns to the ground when God tries to impress a woman by lighting her cigarette with a thunderbolt. God and Jesus escape by driving away in their Cadillac Escalade, but a blind Peter, without realizing it, rescues Horace from the inferno and becomes a local hero. The Drunken Clam becomes a Karaoke Bar in "Don't Make Me Over", as the gang helps Horace to put the bar back on its feet against the competition from a new shopping mall. Other renovation attempts, including the original theme to the film Coyote Ugly, had previously failed.

As seen in "Stewie B. Goode", Brian takes Stewie to the Clam in an effort to persuade him of the dangers of alcohol. Brian is unsuccessful in his attempt, and is so drunk that he is unable to drive, giving an equally intoxicated Stewie his car keys. Stewie crashes Brian's Prius through the wall of the bar, an event shown on the news by Tom Tucker in an attempt to expose Peter. In "Meet the Quagmires", Death shows up when Horace falls off his ladder in the Clam, while trying to fix the TV—Horace is only knocked unconscious. This allows Peter to ask Death to return him to the 1980s, so he can live a wild youth. Part of that experience includes visiting the 1980s bar—then called "St. Elmo's Clam"—a reference to the electrical phenomenon and to the song "St Elmo's Fire". Here Peter plays "Menstrual Ms. Pac-Man", meets and makes out with actress Molly Ringwald, and joins Cleveland at an evening disco. This contradicts the bar's appearance in "One if by Clam, Two if by Sea", where in the same year, it was still The Drunken Clam. The Clam's back room, complete with a table tennis table, is seen in "Hell Comes to Quahog", in which Joe becomes competitive and beats Peter, Cleveland and Quagmire at table tennis.

In the sixth season episode "Believe It or Not, Joe's Walking on Air", the guys' significant others, Lois, Bonnie and even Muriel, wife of recurring character and Jewish pharmacist Mort Goldman, as well as Cleveland's girlfriend at the time, Bernice, begin hanging out at the Clam, forcing the guys to open the Quahog Men's Club. The guys were able to reclaim the Clam soon after. Due to Cleveland's absence from Family Guy, Peter, Quagmire and Joe meet their new black friend, Jerome, in "Jerome Is the New Black". However, the vacancy reopens at the end of the episode. In "Back to the Pilot", it is revealed that if Frank Sinatra had never been born, The Clam would be long abandoned as of 2009 in the Apocalyptic Universe, as it is seen in shambles. Horace dies in "Save the Clam", leaving the guys to try to find a way to save the bar from foreclosure. Eventually, Jerome shows up and reveals he bought the Clam with his sports earnings, allowing it to stay open.

In "Finders Keepers", a waiter tells Stewie that his placemat is a real treasure map, then tells a probably false story about Miles "Chatterbox" Musket which impresses Peter, despite Lois's insistence that it is a joke. Refusing to give up, Peter and Lois search leads them to The Drunken Clam. Behind a painting of legendary Quahog founder Miles "Chatterbox" Musket, they find a treasure chest containing an expired restaurant coupon for a free meal which was a promotion by The Founding Father Restaurant. The Clam is parodied as "Ye Soused Mackerel" in the Romeo and Juliet segment of "Heart Burn".

References to real-world locations 
Family Guy creator Seth MacFarlane resided in Providence, Rhode Island during his time as a student at Rhode Island School of Design, and the show contains distinct Rhode Island landmarks similar to real-world locations. MacFarlane often borrows the names of Rhode Island locations and icons such as Pawtucket and Buddy Cianci for use in the show. Several times every episode (except maybe for the Star Wars episodes), the actual Providence skyline can be seen in the distance. The three buildings that are depicted are, from left to right and furthest to closest: One Financial Center, 50 Kennedy Plaza, and the Superman Building. This ordering of buildings and the angle at which they are viewed indicates that Quahog is primarily west of downtown Providence. Quahog is often stated to be either Johnston, Rhode Island; Cranston, Rhode Island; North Providence, Rhode Island; Scituate, Rhode Island; or a western portion of Providence itself. However, in a few episodes Quahog is shown to have a coastline in episodes such as "Fifteen Minutes of Shame", "Fore Father", and "Perfect Castaway", which only Cranston and Providence possess. This is supported by the fact that the real-world "31 Spooner Street" is located in Providence, immediately due west of Roger Williams Park. MacFarlane has said in the DVD commentary for the episode "When You Wish Upon a Weinstein" that the street was named after Spooner Hill Road, which is his childhood home. Also, a map seen in "Fifteen Minutes of Shame" does not resemble a map of the neighborhood of Spooner Street.

In "Not All Dogs Go To Heaven", the "zoom out" at the end shows Quahog to be somewhere between Cranston and Warwick, almost directly north of the Theodore Francis Green Airport. In "E. Peterbus Unum", a map of Rhode Island is shown, with Quahog shaded in red. Quahog is shown in the vicinity of Tiverton, Rhode Island. Quahog is also shown to be within driving distance to Newport, Rhode Island, which is also where Lois Griffin's parents Babs and Carter Pewterschmidt live. In an interview with Providence's Fox affiliate WNAC-TV, MacFarlane stated that the town is modeled after Cranston.

Name significance 

A quahog is an edible clam. The name "Quahog", however, appears to be based on the unrelated toponym Quonochontaug, though both are from the Narragansett language. Select regional DVD releases to state on the rear cover "Meet the Griffins and find out what in the name of Quonochontaug, Rhode Island is going on in their heads!", giving "Quonochontaug" as the name for the fictional Quahog. Many of the features of Quahog exist in Quonochontaug, such as a coast. Many people living in Quonochontaug commonly refer to the town as Quahog. However, the real Quonochontaug is a tiny village community of no more than a few hundred people located within the rural town of Charlestown, Rhode Island, more than halfway across the state from Providence where the skyline would not be visible.

In a 2007 interview with The New York Times, producer and writer Danny Smith stated: "When we first started doing the show, Fox wanted us to make the show specific to one town or region. I remember turning to Seth and saying, ‘Oh, man, Rhode Island. It has to be Rhode Island.'" For Smith, the town had to be fictional. "Years ago, I was writing for a show called Nurses and I wrote a joke about Pawtucket. It was just a joke, but a lot of people from Pawtucket took it seriously, including the Mayor of Pawtucket. I was vilified back home on talk radio. I had visions of people from Pawtucket chasing me down Benefit Street with pitchforks and torches. I didn't want to risk having another town angry with me, so it was my idea to create Quahog, Rhode Island."

References 
  Text was copied from The Drunken Clam at Family Guy Wiki, which is released under a Creative Commons Attribution-Share Alike 3.0 (Unported) (CC-BY-SA 3.0) license.

Family Guy
Fictional populated places in Rhode Island
Fictional populated places in the United States